Leopoldsburg is a municipality located in the Belgian province of Limburg. On January 1, 2006, Leopoldsburg had a total population of 14,403. The total area is 22.49 km² (8.68 sq mi) which gives a population density of 640 inhabitants per km² (1,658.7/sq mi). It is situated near the important military base at Beverloo Camp.
The municipality consists of the following sub-municipalities: Leopoldsburg proper and Heppen.

See also
 Limburg Shotguns, an American Football team from Leopoldsburg

References

External links
 
Official site of the municipality (in Dutch)
An unofficial site of Leopoldsburg. In Dutch and English

Municipalities of Limburg (Belgium)